Emil Hájek,  (March 3, 1886, Königgrätz (north-east Kingdom of Bohemia, Austria-Hungary  March 17, 1974, in Belgrade, SR Serbia, SFR Yugoslavia) was a Serbian pianist, composer (student of Antonín Dvořák) and music pedagogue of Czech descent.

As a professor of piano at the Belgrade Music Academy, he was one of the founders of modern Serbian pianistic school. He was also a founding member and first president of the Association of Musical Artists of Serbia. From 1920 to 1921, he served as director of the Saratov Conservatory. His students included Serbian composer Darinka Simic-Mitrovic.

References 

1886 births
1974 deaths
Yugoslav pianists
Academic staff of the University of Arts in Belgrade
Musicians from Hradec Králové
20th-century Russian male musicians
Academic staff of Saratov Conservatory